Viktor Karpovich Asmayev (16 November 1947 in Rostov-on-Don – 12 October 2002) was an equestrian and Olympic champion from Russia. He won a gold medal in show jumping with the Soviet team at the 1980 Summer Olympics in Moscow, Russia.

References

External links

1947 births
2002 deaths
Russian male equestrians
Soviet male equestrians
Olympic equestrians of the Soviet Union
Olympic gold medalists for the Soviet Union
Equestrians at the 1980 Summer Olympics
Olympic medalists in equestrian
Medalists at the 1980 Summer Olympics
Sportspeople from Rostov-on-Don